"Tell Me a Lie" is a 1974 song by Lynn Anderson, covered by Sami Jo (1974) and Janie Fricke (1983).

Tell Me a Lie may also refer to:

Tell Me a Lie, a 1982 album by Bettye LaVette
"Tell Me a Lie", a 1995 song by Jim Johnston from WWE Anthology
"Tell Me a Lie", a 2008 song by the Fratellis from Here We Stand
"Tell Me a Lie", a 2011 song by One Direction from Up All Night
Tell Me a Lie, a 2007 manga by Gosho Aoyama

See also
Tell Me Lies, a 1968 British film by Peter Brook
Lie to Me (disambiguation)